Peak 11,272, at , is the officially unnamed fifth-highest peak of the White Cloud Mountains of the U.S. state of Idaho. The Big Boulder Lakes are located north of the peak.

References 

Mountains of Custer County, Idaho
Mountains of Idaho
Sawtooth National Forest